Takhtgah-e Surat Khanom (also Romanized as Takhtgāh-e Şūrat Khānom; also known as Takhtgāh-e Şūrat) is a village in Gurani Rural District, Gahvareh District, Dalahu County, Kermanshah Province, Iran. At the 2006 census, its population was 92, in 25 families.

References 

Populated places in Dalahu County